Genèvre Charles (born 22 July 1992) is a Haitian footballer who plays as a forward. She has been a member of the Haiti women's national team.

International career
Charles capped for Haiti at senior level during the 2014 CONCACAF Women's Championship.

References

1992 births
Living people
Haitian women's footballers
Women's association football forwards
Haiti women's international footballers